Pilang can refer to:
Pilang, an alternate name for the pelang, an outrigger boat from Indonesia and Malaysia
Pilang, an alternate name for the vinta, an outrigger canoe from the Philippines